The R Document (1976), by Irving Wallace,  is a novel in the genres of the political thriller and the legal thriller, which recounts the secret coup d’état by the director of the Federal Bureau of Investigation (FBI) to void the Bill of Rights, and so assume power in the United States.

Plot summary

Setting
The R Document occurs during a future time in the United States when crime, especially violent crime, has become so extreme a problem that FBI Director Vernon T. Tynan is promoting an especially drastic solution: a Thirty-Fifth Article Of Amendment to the Constitution of the United States that would allow the Bill of Rights to be suspended in favor of its provisions during a national domestic crisis. Tynan, who had joined the Bureau during J. Edgar Hoover's tenure as its Director, had resigned after Hoover had died (saying that "once you had worked for the Old Man...you were spoiled for anyone else" to Ishmael Young, whom he has extorted into ghost-writing his autobiography) rather than work under any of Hoover's successors. (Wallace, indeed, had initially modeled Tynan on Hoover.)

Background
The protagonist of the novel is Attorney General Christopher Collins, whom Wallace modeled on Ramsey Clark, who, while in that office, became one of Hoover's bitterest enemies. At the time when the novel begins, his predecessor, former United States Army Colonel Noah Baxter, is ill, and indeed dying, from a stroke he had suffered. Tynan, the novel's primary antagonist, is responsible for having proposed the 35th Amendment and sold it to Andrew Wadsworth, President of the United States, and the Congress. Moreover, he has secretly formed a two-stage plan to supplement and implement the 35th upon its ratification—that plan going under the code name of "The R Document." (The "R" stands for "reconstruction," specifically that of the United States, so "The R Document" is really "The Reconstruction Document.") Baxter, who had suffered his stroke during a meeting with Tynan and Associate Deputy FBI Director Harry Adcock (modeled by Wallace on Clyde Tolson, complete to the rumors of a homosexual relationship between the two) several months before the events in the novel, tries to reveal to Collins the truth about The R Document and its two "pages," but Baxter dies before he can pass on to Collins what he knows. A Catholic, Baxter had made a deathbed confession to a priest in which he had mentioned The R Document, and Tynan has Adcock attempt (vainly as it proves) to learn that confession's contents from the priest by extortion. This extortion, which fails, owes to an attempt that hard-core delinquents had made, years ago, to stop an anti-drug crusade which the priest had been conducting by entrapping him for drug dealing. The priest ultimately passes on to Collins what little Baxter could tell him of his deathbed message.

Tynan's underhandedness
Tynan proves to be attempting to bring about ratification of the 35th by means of similar scandal-based extortions of the California legislators who will vote on its ratification. Indeed, he has been expanding the Official And Confidential, or "OC," Files that Hoover maintained, for bullying and scandal-based extortion. Collins, who himself is from California, is advised to argue for the amendment on a program called Search For Truth. But once he is in California, an attempt, ultimately unsuccessful, is made to compromise him by having a prostitute planted in his hotel room.

Search For Truth
On the set of the program, which a certain Brant Vanbrugh moderates, Collins is embroiled in a debate with Tony Pierce, who had resigned from the FBI after throwing his support to FBI Special Agents that Tynan was manhandling (who themselves had also resigned from the Tynan Bureau as a direct result) and now heads a grassroots organization called DBR, or Defenders of the Bill of Rights, which he has organized to stop the 35th. Before their debate begins, Collins realizes that he is defending a bomb that will blow the Bill of Rights out of the Constitution because of his own ambition to show his father what he has achieved—misplaced ambition because his father has been dead for years by this time. After the debate ends, the nauseated Collins barely finds a men's restroom and vomits into its toilet, having realized that he has been on the wrong side of the debate over the 35th the whole time.

Tynan against Collins and Collins's encounter with Radenbaugh
Collins's son Josh has joined DBR, and he points out to his father that no government of any truly free nation has a qualified bill of rights which is unguaranteed and/or can be suspended or revoked in peacetime; only tyrannies and freedomless nations do. Tynan, in the meantime, is trying to destroy Collins, whom he and Adcock had realized—through bugging, eavesdropping, and wiretapping—might not be fully behind the 35th before Collins himself did. To do that without involving President Wadsworth, Tynan seeks out money (from illegal campaign contributions) from Donald Radenbaugh, an attorney whom Baxter considered one of his few friends and confidants, who has been confined in Lewisburg Prison since being wrongly convicted of extortion. After springing Radenbaugh and giving him the false identity of Herbert Miller, Tynan uses the money to stage Miller's murder. Horrified at what Tynan has done, Radenbaugh seeks out his daughter, whom he encounters as Collins is visiting her.

Radenbaugh's story
Radenbaugh then tells Collins about Page 1 of The R Document, explaining that Tynan had conceived the 35th Amendment by examining communities with low crime rates in hopes of recommending anti-crime legislation to Wadsworth and the Congress, and finding "company towns" to have the lowest crime rates, and Argo City, Arizona, owned by Argo Smelting And Mining, where the Bill of Rights had been effectively suspended, to have the best long-time record. Tynan's pilot program for the 35th, his test of it in action, consisted of his running a prototype safety committee in Argo City; the results of Tynan's experiment there, Radenbaugh explains, make up Page 1 of The R Document.

Argo City
Collins and Radenbaugh travel to Argo City along with John G. Maynard, Chief Justice of the Supreme Court of the United States, who had sworn both Collins and Wadsworth into their respective offices. What they discover there leaves Maynard so horror-stricken that he plans to denounce the 35th. But Tynan has him killed before he can get the chance.

Smear campaign
To preserve his own job as FBI Director when Collins tries to get him dismissed after Maynard's murder, Tynan targets Collins's wife Karen, a mother to be about whose status as such few others know as the novel begins. Tynan first accuses Karen of a murder for which she had been prosecuted before she and Collins had first met. At her trial, whose prosecutor had been trying to make a name for himself, the deadlocked jury that had forced a mistrial had favored her acquittal eleven to one from the first minute of deliberations; the one holdout, who had once worked for Karen's father but been fired from his job, had been finding her father, not Karen herself, guilty, and had held out for four days before the others gave up on the case. When that apparently fails, Tynan alleges that Karen, who is actually shy when it comes to marital affections, has been a central participant in wild orgies.

FBI and IFBI
Collins, for his part, has encountered Pierce and the former FBI Special Agents Tynan had manhandled by threatening them with assignments of exile to Butte, Montana or Cincinnati, Ohio, which are described as Tynan's political prisons for Bureau personnel whom he wishes to punish, belittle, or humiliate. (The former Butte, Montana, FBI field office has been closed as needless since the publication of the novel, with the Salt Lake City, Utah  field office having absorbed its former jurisdiction.) These former Special Agents have formed a group they call, unofficially, the IFBI, which stands for the Investigators of the Federal Bureau of Investigation. During this, Collins discovers that Baxter's grandson Rick had accidentally caught the Tynan-Baxter conference in Baxter's house on tape the previous January, when Baxter had suffered his stroke. It contains Page 2 of The R Document, and as Adcock has been eavesdropping and has learned of it as well, he intercepts the original tape before destroying it before Collins's and Pierce's eyes. It is Karen who realizes that Ishmael Young may have a copy of Rick Baxter's tape, and she so informs her husband.

Exposure!
Young, seeking justice for having been forced to ghost-write Tynan's autobiography, does indeed prove to have the copy of Rick Baxter's tape, which is copied and authenticated. Collins then manages—barely in time—to reveal its contents to California legislators. As it proves, under Page 2 of The R Document, Tynan would actually personally create the national crisis that the 35th, once ratified, would need to be invoked by ordering the President of the United States assassinated, thereby giving the Attorney General grounds to suspend the Bill of Rights. Learning about this plot from Tynan had apparently been what had triggered Baxter's ultimately deadly stroke, and learning the contents of Page 2 of The R Document ends up striking the shocked legislators as a "Reichstag fire" that would make Tynan effectively the "Fuehrer of America." The 35th is unanimously defeated, and the Bill of Rights is saved. Tynan shoots himself in the mouth ("like Hitler," Collins remarks), and Adcock disappears ("like Bormann" is Collins's reaction). The novel ends with grounds for hope, as the President agrees to pardon the wrongly-convicted Radenbaugh, then forms a commission (including Collins and Pierce as members) to clean Tynan's evil influence out of the FBI and overhaul it; after that, he promises to discuss, with Collins, a comprehensive program of economic and social legislation which will be intended to solve the problem of crime, the original problem that had actually led Tynan to hatch his plot in the first place.

Commercial Reception
The R Document spent 13 weeks on the New York Times best seller list, peaking at #3.

Adaptation
The book was produced as a mini-series in the Soviet Union in 1985 by Valery Kharchenko. The majority of the characters were acted out by actors from Latvia and Estonia, both of which were then Soviet Socialist Republics. However, as it accused the American government of being run secretly, from behind the scenes, by an evil, tyrannical cabal and completely negated Wallace's own civil-libertarian arguments, he publicly disowned it. No other known adaptations of The R Document were produced during Wallace's lifetime.

References

1976 American novels
Political thriller novels
Novels by Irving Wallace
Simon & Schuster books
American political novels
American thriller novels